Herman Gordon Nelson (born September 20, 1961) is an American racewalker. He competed in the men's 50 kilometres walk at the 1992 Summer Olympics and the 1996 Summer Olympics.

References

1961 births
Living people
Athletes (track and field) at the 1992 Summer Olympics
Athletes (track and field) at the 1996 Summer Olympics
American male racewalkers
Olympic track and field athletes of the United States
Place of birth missing (living people)